Zhangwu County is a county in the north of Liaoning province, China. It is served by G25 Changchun–Shenzhen Expressway, G2511 Xinmin–Lubei Expressway, and China National Highways 101 and 304.

Climate
Zhangwu County has a monsoon-influenced humid continental climate (Köppen Dwa), with great seasonal contrast in temperature, precipitation, and humidity. Precipitation is very low in winter and is heavily concentrated in the summer months. With monthly percent possible sunshine ranging from 46% in July to 67% in January and February, there are 2,673 hours of bright sunshine annually.

Administrative divisions
There are eight towns, 12 townships, and four ethnic townships in the county.

Towns:
Zhangwu
Harto
Zhanggutai
Dongliujiazi
Wufeng
Fengjia
Houxinqiu
A'erxiang

Townships:

References

External links

County-level divisions of Liaoning